Nathaniel Hone may refer to:

Nathaniel Hone the Elder (1718–1784), Irish painter
Nathaniel Hone the Younger (1831–1917), Irish painter
Nathaniel Hone (cricketer, born 1861), Irish cricketer